Akela  is a Bollywood social film released in 1941. It was produced by K. B. Desai Productions under the banner of Great India Pictures and directed by Pessi Karani. The film starred Bibbo, Mazhar Khan, E. Billimoria, Miss Moti, Pratima Devi, Bose, and Mohammed Hadi. Its music was composed by Khan Mastana and the lyrics were written by Pyare Lal Santoshi.

Cast
 Mazhar Khan
 Bibbo
 E. Bilimoria
 Moti
 Bose
 Hadi
 Pratima Devi

References

External links
 

1941 films
1940s Hindi-language films
Films scored by Khan Mastana
Indian black-and-white films